Sebe is a formal capital of German Togoland.

Sebe may also refer to:

 SEbE, or Southeast by east, a compass point
 Sebe, a variety of the Bine language of Papua New Guinea
 Sebe River in Gabon
 Sebe (surname)

See also 
 Sebe-Brikolo Department, a department in eastern Gabon
 Sebbe, a 2010 Swedish film
 Sebeh, a ritual performed on the Korean New Year
 Seebe, Alberta, a former hamlet in Canada